Arkansas Highway 124 is a designation for two state highways in Central Arkansas. The western segment of  runs from Russellville to Rose Bud. An eastern segment of  runs east in White County from Pangburn to AR 157.

Route description

Russellville to Rose Bud
The route begins at US 64 in Russellville and runs north to Interstate 40. It continues east to intersect AR 164 in Moreland and AR 105 in Caglesville before entering Conway County. AR 124 winds east and then south in Conway County before forming a concurrency with AR 95. The highway runs east to concur with AR 9 in Center Ridge, becoming AR 92/AR 124 until Springfield. AR 124 enters Cleburne County and has many intersections in Quitman, including AR 25. The highway continues east into White County to AR 36 in Rose Bud, where it terminates.

Pangburn to Sunnydale
AR 124 begins at AR 110 in Pangburn and runs east. The highway in intersected by Arkansas Highway 305, and a short concurrency forms. The highway runs further east to intersect AR 157 in Sunnydale, where it terminates. It is entirely two-lane and undivided.

History
The route was added to the state highway system in 1927, a year after Arkansas first numbered its highways. The route ran from Russellville to Caglesville and was an unimproved road. The following year, AR 124 was extended to Arkansas Highway 95 in Conway County. At this time, AR 124 from Russellville to Caglesville was graded, but the extension was not. In 1933, the route was shortened, running only from Russellville to Appleton (entirely in Pope County). By 1926, the unimproved segment from Appleton to AR 95 was again added to AR 124. The routing remained unchanged until 1953, when the route was extended along its modern alignment.

Formerly, AR 124 had its western terminus at the intersection of AR 7 and O Street in Russellville. The highway passed over I-40 without an interchange before meeting its current alignment east of town. When Highway 124 was widened northeast of Russellville, it was realigned onto Weir Road, formerly a stretch of AR 326.

Major intersections
Mile markers reset at concurrencies.

|colspan=4 align=center| AR 105 concurrency north

|colspan=5 align=center| AR 95 concurrency north

|Birdtown
|colspan=4 align=center| AR 9/AR 92 concurrency south

|colspan=4 align=center| US 65 concurrency north

See also

 List of state highways in Arkansas

References

External links

124
Transportation in Pope County, Arkansas
Transportation in Conway County, Arkansas
Transportation in Faulkner County, Arkansas
Transportation in Van Buren County, Arkansas
Transportation in Cleburne County, Arkansas
Transportation in White County, Arkansas